Socorro, officially the Municipality of Socorro (Surigaonon: Lungsod nan Socorro), is a 4th class municipality in the province of Surigao del Norte, Philippines. According to the 2020 census, it has a population of 25,942 people.

The municipal territory is contiguous with Bucas Grande.

Geography

Barangays
Socorro is politically subdivided into 14 barangays.
 Albino Taruc
 Del Pilar 
 Doña Helene 
 Honrado
 Navarro (Poblacion) 
 Nueva Estrella 
 Pamosaingan (formerly Gardeña and part of Del Carmen)
 Rizal (Poblacion) 
 Salog
 San Roque
 Santa Cruz 
 Sering
 Songkoy 
 Sudlon

Climate

Demographics

Economy

References

External links

Socorro Profile at PhilAtlas.com
  Socorro Profile at the DTI Cities and Municipalities Competitive Index
[ Philippine Standard Geographic Code]
Philippine Census Information
Local Governance Performance Management System

Municipalities of Surigao del Norte
Island municipalities in the Philippines